Omari Jahi Palmer (born May 17, 1994) is an American professional wrestler. He is currently signed to WWE, where he performs on The NXT  Brand under the ring name Odyssey Jones.

Early life 
Palmer was born in Coram, New York. He attended Longwood High School, where he competed in football, basketball, lacrosse, and wrestling. Palmer went on to attend Syracuse University, majoring in sociology. During his time at Syracuse University, Palmer played for the Syracuse Orange football team as an offensive guard until suffering a lower leg injury during his senior year.

Professional wrestling career 
In June 2018, Palmer attended a try-out with the professional wrestling promotion WWE. In February 2019, he was hired by WWE and assigned to the WWE Performance Center in Orlando, Florida for training. In May 2019, Palmer set an  trap bar deadlift record at the WWE Performance Center Combine, beating the previous record of  held by Otis. He wrestled his first match on November 7, 2019, losing to Dexter Lumis at a house show in Ocala, Florida under his birth name. He wrestled a handful of matches in late-2019 and early-2020 before going on hiatus for over a year.

Palmer returned to the ring in July 2021 under the new ring name of "Odyssey Jones", wrestling dark matches at WWE SmackDown tapings. He wrestled his first televised match on the July 6 episode of WWE 205 Live, defeating Grayson Waller. On July 20, he wrestled his first televised WWE NXT match, defeating Andre Chase in the first round of the WWE NXT Breakout Tournament. He went on to defeat Trey Baxter in the semi-finals before losing to Carmelo Hayes in the finals. Jones then spent the rest of the year on NXT engaging in feuds with heels such as Andre Chase and the Diamond Mine.

In January 2022, Palmer ruptured his patellar tendon during a match with Saurav Gurjar; he underwent surgery later that month. Jones made his return on the October 25, 2022 episode of NXT, inviting Edris Enofé and Malik Blade to a party. The following week, he made his in-ring return by defeating Javier Bernal.

Professional wrestling style and persona 
Jones wrestles in a "powerhouse" style. His finishing moves have included a falling powerslam and a diving splash. He wears orange and blue ring attire; a reference to the Syracuse Orange colors. He is nicknamed the "Future Favorite".

References

External links 
 
 
 
 

1994 births
21st-century African-American sportspeople
21st-century professional wrestlers
African-American male professional wrestlers
American football offensive guards
American male professional wrestlers
Living people
People from Coram, New York
Players of American football from New York (state)
Professional wrestlers from New York (state)
Syracuse Orange football players
Syracuse University alumni